The Bimberi Nature Reserve is a protected nature reserve located in the Brindabella Range of New South Wales, in eastern Australia.

Features
Bimberi Nature Reserve lies between Kosciuszko National Park in New South Wales and Namadgi National Park in the Australian Capital Territory.  It also adjoins Brindabella National Park in New South Wales. Bimberi Nature Reserve is managed by the NSW National Parks & Wildlife Service.

The boundary between New South Wales and the Australian Capital Territory, and the boundary between Bimberi Nature Reserve and Namadgi National Park, both pass through the summit of Bimberi Peak, which is the highest point in Bimberi Nature Reserve, as well as the highest point in the Australian Capital Territory.

On 7 November 2008, the Bimberi Nature Reserve was added to the Australian National Heritage List as one of eleven areas constituting the Australian Alps National Parks and Reserves.

See also

 Protected areas of New South Wales

References

External links

Nature reserves in New South Wales
Protected areas established in 1985
Australian National Heritage List
Ski areas and resorts in New South Wales
Brindabella Ranges
Australian Alps National Parks and Reserves
1985 establishments in Australia